Blackadder II is the second series of the BBC sitcom Blackadder, written by Richard Curtis and Ben Elton, which aired from 9 January 1986 to 20 February 1986. The series is set in England during the reign of Queen Elizabeth I (1558–1603), and sees the principal character, Edmund, Lord Blackadder, as a Tudor courtier attempting to win the favour of the Queen while avoiding execution by decapitation, a fate that befell many of her suitors.

The series differed markedly from The Black Adder, notably with Ben Elton replacing Rowan Atkinson as the second writer, filming in studio sets, rather than on location, the introduction of a Machiavellian "Blackadder" character and a less intelligent Baldrick.

Plot
The series is set during the Elizabethan era (1558–1603). The principal character, Edmund, Lord Blackadder (Rowan Atkinson), is the great-grandson of the original Black Adder, and is now a member of the London aristocracy. Unlike his forefather, he is both dashing and intelligent, although he is still scheming and cynical in his outlook. The series follows his attempts to win the favour of the childish Queen Elizabeth I (Miranda Richardson). As before, he is aided, and often hindered, by two less-than-intelligent sidekicks, his servant Baldrick (Tony Robinson), and Lord Percy Percy (Tim McInnerny), heir to the Duchy of Northumberland, with whom Blackadder has a grudging friendship.

Throughout the series, Blackadder's chief rival is Lord Melchett (Stephen Fry), the Queen's pretentious and grovelling Lord Chamberlain. Melchett fears upsetting the Queen, and thus attempts to outdo Blackadder by supporting the Queen in whatever current fad she is interested in. Comic relief in the Court is provided by the Queen's demented former nanny, Nursie (Patsy Byrne).

Baldrick, who in the first series was the most intelligent of the main trio, became more stupid, an idea proposed by Ben Elton to make him "the stupidest person in the history of...human beings", and to act as a foil to Blackadder's new-found intelligence. The series was also the originator of Baldrick's obsession with the turnip, although this apparently arose from a botanical error on the part of Elton, who confused the vegetable with the "amusingly shaped" parsnip.

Lord Percy remained similar in character to the original series, as a foolish sidekick in Blackadder's plots and predicaments. In this respect, McInnerny said the character resembled Sir Andrew Aguecheek in Shakespeare's Twelfth Night. As with The Black Adder, the series featured many tongue-in-cheek references to Shakespeare's plays; Shakespeare is mentioned as a contemporary Elizabethan, and his famous quotations are twisted for comic effect. The first episode "Bells", follows a similar plot to Twelfth Night.

Episodes

The series aired for six episodes broadcast on Thursdays on BBC 1 at 9.30pm between 9 January 1986 and 20 February 1986.

"Head" was originally intended to be the first episode and was first to be filmed. This resulted in the small continuity error of Lord Percy still having a beard in "Head" which he shaves off in "Bells". In addition, during the early scenes of "Head", the principal characters are introduced to the audience with Baldrick's stupidity highlighted.

Production

Development
Due to the high cost of the first series, Michael Grade (the then controller of programming of BBC 1) was reluctant to sign off a second series without major improvements and cost-cutting, leaving a gap of three years between the two series.

Rowan Atkinson did not wish to continue writing for the second series, so writer and stand-up comedian Ben Elton was chosen to replace him. According to producer John Lloyd, Ben Elton was particularly keen on the choice of the Elizabethan age for the series, because it was "a sexy age that the kids can relate to." As a stand-up comic, Elton often acted as the studio warm-up comic to amuse the audience before filming began. The scripts were also tightened up during principal rehearsals with the actors; according to Richard Curtis, an entire script for a murder mystery-style episode was dropped because the writers felt it did not work.

Filming
To make the show more cost-effective, it was principally filmed on specially designed small sets at BBC Television Centre created by designer Tony Thorpe. The sets were de-constructed and rebuilt during the period of studio filming, as was normal for studio series then. In particular, the Queen's throne room and Blackadder's front room were featured in every episode, with only two further unique sets per episode, including an execution chamber in "Head" and a Spanish dungeon in "Chains". Only one outside location shoot was used in the whole series, which took place before principal filming on Thursday 30 May 1985 at Wilton House, Wiltshire. These outdoor scenes were Blackadder's courting scene in "Bells" and the end title sequences. Studio recordings shot in front of a live audience began on Sunday 9 June 1985 with the recording of "Head". Subsequent episodes were filmed on a weekly basis in the sequence "Bells", "Potato", "Money", "Beer" and "Chains". Director Mandie Fletcher was keen for the action to be shot spontaneously and was averse to complex costume changes or special effects which required recording to be halted. She is reputed to have said filming it was "a bit like doing Shakespeare in front of an audience – it's not at all like doing sitcom."

Cast
The size of the principal cast was reduced compared to the previous series, with a fixed number of characters appearing in every episode. Richard Curtis has been quoted as saying that due to the familiar cast, the series was the happiest for him to work on, comparing it to a "friendly bunch of school chums".

 Rowan Atkinson as Lord Edmund Blackadder
 Tim McInnerny as Lord Percy Percy, Heir to the Duchy of Northumberland
 Tony Robinson as Baldrick
 Miranda Richardson as Queen Elizabeth I of England
 Stephen Fry as Lord Melchett, the Lord Chamberlain
 Patsy Byrne as Nursie

The series also featured at least one significant cameo role per episode. Notable appearances include Rik Mayall as the debonair Lord Flashheart in "Bells"; Tom Baker and Simon Jones as Captain Redbeard Rum and Sir Walter Raleigh, respectively, in "Potato"; Ronald Lacey as the Baby-Eating Bishop of Bath and Wells in "Money"; Miriam Margolyes, who had appeared in the previous series, as the puritanical Lady Whiteadder in "Beer"; and Stephen Fry's comedy partner Hugh Laurie, who appears twice, first as the drunken Simon Partridge in "Beer" and in the final episode as the evil Prince Ludwig. Laurie was later given a larger role as George in the next two series. Also Bob, played by Gabrielle Glaister, a former classmate of Ben Elton's, made her first appearance. Several of the characters were seen in similar guises in later series.

Music and titles
The opening titles are accompanied by a mock-Elizabethan arrangement of Howard Goodall's Blackadder theme played on a recorder and an electric guitar, and feature a black snake slithering about on a marble table. The snake, non-compliant to the wishes of its handler, is eventually removed and replaced with something related to the episode title, which in this series is always a single noun. The opening ominous string crescendo and imagery are a parody of the opening credits of I, Claudius, the 1976 BBC television adaptation of Robert Graves' novel of the same name.

The closing titles use a different arrangement of the theme, sung by countertenor Jeremy Jackman, with lyrics (usually insulting Blackadder) that reflect the events of the preceding episode. The song is played over a shot of Blackadder strolling through a formal garden and being annoyed by the lute-wielding minstrel (Tony Aitken). This sequence was incorporated as a separate subplot, with Blackadder constantly attempting to apprehend the musician each time with limited success. At the end of the final episode, Blackadder catches the minstrel and repeatedly dunks him in a fountain.

Releases
The complete series of Blackadder II is available as a Region 2 DVD from BBC Worldwide, as well as in a complete box-set with the other series, most recently as a remastered edition including a commentary on selected episodes. An earlier VHS release of the series was also produced in 1996. The series is also available in Region 1 DVD in a box-set of the complete series. In addition, an audio recording taken from the television episodes is available on cassette and compact disc.

VHS releases

 In about October 1989, BBC Enterprises Ltd released all six episodes of Blackadder II on two single videos; they were re-released on 7 September 1992 in 'Complete', a double-VHS box set. All six episodes were re-released on a single video on 2 October 1995.

DVD releases

References
Notes

Citations

External links

 
 Blackadder II at the former BBC Guide to Comedy (archive)

1980s British sitcoms
1986 British television series debuts
1986 British television series endings
Alternate history television series
BBC black comedy television shows
BBC television sitcoms
Blackadder
Cultural depictions of Elizabeth I
British parody television series
English-language television shows
Television set in Tudor England
Television series set in the 16th century
Television shows set in London
Works set in castles